Stomago Sagrado was a Mexican rock band formed in Mexico city in 1980 by Victor Basurto and Jorge Beltran, both of Humus and Frolic Froth fame.

Band members

Pepe Bobadilla: Guitar and Vocals.
Victor Basurto: Bass.
Jorge Beltran: Guitar and Vocals.
Pablo Casar: Drums. 
Alberto Turbay: Vocals, Lead and Rhythm Guitar

Mentor

Their music mentor was Alberto Turbay - from Maracaibo, Venezuela - who had great credentials as a keyboard player, band leader, composer and arranger. Being well versed in the styles of Deep Purple, Led Zeppelin, Boston, Earth Wind and Fire, Santana, etc., he founded and led Rock, Pop and Funk bands in his hometown, including "Catarsis" whose members - after Alberto left Maracaibo to continue his music studies at the Conservatorio Nacional de Musica in Mexico City - accompanied for many years famed vocalist Ricardo Montaner, also from Maracaibo, Vzla. 
He left the Mexican scene to attend Boston-based Berklee College of Music from which he received a bachelor's degree in Music. Currently he leaves in Boston, United States, where he is an active vocalist, keyboard, guitar and bass player.

Repertoire

The band played mostly covers by Deep Purple, Santana, The Rolling Stones and Joe Cocker, but they did have two originals, played in their one and only concert in October, though a recording made at a local University internal TV-station survives.

History

The band was a stint - only lasted for six months - but became the foundation of the now long and productive relation of  Jorge Beltran and Victor Basurto, who became founders of several cult bands of the Mexican underground scene of the late 20th century and early 21st,  such as Loch Ness, Humus, Frolic Froth and Smoking the Century Away .

Mexican musical groups